Edward John Whitley  is a British financial advisor and philanthropist.

A member of the Greenall Whitley brewing family, Whitley founded Whitley Asset Management, a privately owned investment advisory firm, in 2001. Prior to this he worked at NM Rothschild and as a TV presenter and Author. Edward Whitley authored two international bestsellers and was a frequent journalist for the Independent and the Times.

Whitley set up the Whitley Awards in 1993 in order to provide funding to local nature conservationists working around the world.  One of the trustees of the Whitley Fund for Nature, which administers the awards and other grants, is Sir David Attenborough. The Princess Royal is Patron. Starting with an annual income of some £15,000 in 1993, the Whitley Fund for Nature is now supported by many donors, both individuals and other charitable trusts, and raises and distributes some £1 million a year. The charity has funded the work of over 190 conservation leaders working in 80 countries.  The Whitley Awards are given at a ceremony at the Royal Geographical Society, London and are unofficially known as the Green Oscars.

Edward Whitley was appointed Officer of the Order of the British Empire (OBE) in the 2013 Birthday Honours for services to wildlife conservation.

Books
The Graduates, Hamish Hamilton, 1986. 
Gerald Durrell’s Army, John Murray, 1992. 
Rogue Trader, co-authored with Nick Leeson, published by Little Brown, 1996

Footnotes

External links
A book review by Edward Whitley on David Hughes' biography of Gerald Durrell, archived in 2005

Year of birth missing (living people)
Living people
British philanthropists
Officers of the Order of the British Empire